Earl of Cardigan is a title in the Peerage of England, currently held by the Marquesses of Ailesbury, and used as a courtesy title by the heir apparent to that Marquessate, currently David Brudenell-Bruce, Earl of Cardigan, son of the 8th Marquess. The Brudenell family descends from Sir Robert Brudenell, Chief Justice of the Common Pleas from 1520 to 1530. His great-grandson, Sir Thomas Brudenell, was created a Baronet in the Baronetage of England, styled "of Deene in the County of Northampton", on 29 June 1611. On 26 February 1628, he was raised to the Peerage of England as Baron Brudenell, of Stanton Wyvill in the County of Leicester, and on 20 April 1661 he was further honoured when he was made Earl of Cardigan, also in the Peerage of England. On his death, the titles passed to his son, Robert, the 2nd Earl, and on the 2nd Earl's death to his grandson, George, the 3rd Earl, the 2nd Earl's only son, Francis, Lord Brudenell, having predeceased his father.

The 3rd Earl's eldest son George, the 4th Earl, married Lady Mary Montagu, daughter of John Montagu, 2nd Duke of Montagu, and succeeded to the Montagu estates on his father-in-law's death in 1749, including the Lordship of Bowland. He assumed the same year by Royal licence the surname of Montagu in lieu of Brudenell. In 1766, he was created Marquess of Monthermer and Duke of Montagu in the Peerage of Great Britain, revivals of the titles which had become extinct on his father-in-law's death in 1749. Montagu's only son and heir, John Montagu, Marquess of Monthermer, had already been created Baron Montagu, of Boughton in the County of Northampton, in the Peerage of Great Britain in 1762, a revival of another title held by his maternal grandfather. However, Lord Monthermer died childless in 1770, predeceasing his father. The barony of Montagu died with him. In 1786, the Duke of Montagu was also created Baron Montagu, of Boughton in the County of Northampton, in the Peerage of Great Britain, with remainder to the younger sons of his daughter, Lady Elizabeth Montagu, wife of Henry Scott, 3rd Duke of Buccleuch. On the Duke's death in 1780, the marquessate and dukedom became extinct while he was succeeded in the barony of Montagu according to the special remainder by his grandson, Henry Scott (see Baron Montagu of Boughton for further history of this title; see also Duke of Montagu).

The earldom, barony of Brudenell and baronetcy passed to the Duke's younger brother, James, the 5th Earl, who already on 17 October 1780 had been created Baron Brudenell, of Deene in the County of Northampton, in the Peerage of Great Britain, in his own right. However, he died childless in 1811 when the barony of 1780 became extinct. He was succeeded in the remaining titles by his nephew, Robert, the 6th Earl, only son of Robert Brudenell, third son of the 3rd Earl. The 6th Earl's only son, James, 7th Earl, gained fame for his role in the Charge of the Light Brigade during the Crimean War. He was childless and on his death in 1868 the titles were inherited by his second cousin, George, 2nd Marquess of Ailesbury, grandson of Thomas Brudenell, the fourth and youngest son of the 3rd Earl. Thomas had succeeded his maternal uncle, the 3rd Earl of Ailesbury and 4th Earl of Elgin, in 1747 as Baron Bruce, of Tottenham in the County of Wilts, had in 1766 assumed the surname "Brudenell-Bruce", and had in 1776 been created Earl of Ailesbury in the Peerage of Great Britain. The 1st Earl of Ailesbury was succeeded by his son, Charles, the 2nd Earl of Ailesbury, who in 1821 had been created Viscount Savernake, of Savernake Forest in the County of Wilts, Earl Bruce, of Whorlton in the County of York, and Marquess of Ailesbury, in the County of Buckingham. He was succeeded by his son, the aforementioned 2nd Marquess of Ailesbury and 8th Earl of Cardigan. For further history of the titles, see Marquess of Ailesbury.

The Earldom remains united with the Marquessate of Ailesbury; and indeed, since the descendants of the 1st Earl of Ailesbury are the only remaining descendants of the 1st Earl of Cardigan, the titles will never be separated. The Earldom remains visible, however, as it is used as a courtesy title by the heirs apparent to the Marquessate.

The family seat Deene Park was not united with the marquessate but was passed down to Commodore Lord Robert Thomas Brudenell-Bruce, the second surviving son of the 3rd Marquess. Lord Robert's son George inherited the family seat along with the family's remaining estates in Leicestershire and Northamptonshire and reverted the family name back to "Brudenell" by Royal Licence. Deene Park is currently the residence of George's grandson Robert Brudenell.

Baron Brudenell (1628)
Thomas Brudenell, 1st Baron Brudenell (c. 1593–1663) (Created Earl of Cardigan in 1661)

Earls of Cardigan (1661)
Thomas Brudenell, 1st Earl of Cardigan (c. 1593–1663)
Robert Brudenell, 2nd Earl of Cardigan (1607-1703)
George Brudenell, 3rd Earl of Cardigan (1692–1732)
George Brudenell, later Montagu, 4th Earl of Cardigan (1712–1790) (created Marquess of Monthermer and Duke of Montagu in 1766 and Baron Montagu of Boughton in 1786)

Dukes of Montagu (1766), Baron Montagu (1786)
George Brudenell, later Montagu, 1st Duke of Montagu, 1st Marquess of Monthermer, 4th Earl of Cardigan, 4th Baron Brudenell, 1st Baron Montagu  (1712–1790)
John Montagu, Marquess of Monthermer, 1st Baron Montagu (of 1762) (1735–1770)

Earls of Cardigan (1661; Reverted)
James Brudenell, 5th Earl of Cardigan, 5th Baron Brudenell, 1st Baron Brudenell (of 1780: extinct) (1715–1811)
Robert Brudenell, 6th Earl of Cardigan, 6th Baron Brudenell (1760–1837) (nephew of his predecessor)
James Thomas Brudenell, 7th Earl of Cardigan, 7th Baron Brudenell (1797–1868) (son of his predecessor)
George William Frederick Brudenell-Bruce, 2nd Marquess of Ailesbury, 8th Earl of Cardigan, 8th Baron Brudenell (1804–1878) (2nd cousin to his predecessor)

see Marquess of Ailesbury for further succession

Family tree

References

Sources

Joan Wake, The History of the Brudenells of Deene (London: Cassels) 1953.

 

Earl
 
Earldoms in the Peerage of England
Noble titles created in 1661
1611 establishments in England